Antigua and Barbuda has an embassy in Madrid. Spain is accredited to Antigua and Barbuda from its embassy in Kingston, Jamaica.

Historical relations 

Christopher Columbus sighted the islands on his second voyage in 1493, naming the largest as Antigua in honor of Saint Mary the Ancient of Seville (in correspondence to Santa María la Redonda, today Redonda). Barbuda later received his strange name for the "beards" of lichens that adorned his palm trees. The first European attempts to settle on the islands failed due to the excellent defenses of the Caribs. The island was first colonized by the Spaniards, but soon passed to the Buccaneers.

Diplomatic relations 
Spain established diplomatic relations with Antigua and Barbuda in 1988. The Spanish Embassy in Kingston is accredited before the old government. The Ambassador of Spain to Antigua and Barbuda, Aníbal Jiménez Abascal, presented credentials to the Governor General of Antigua and Barbuda in September 2014. 

The Ambassador of Antigua and Barbuda, H.E Dario Item, is accredited in Spain and is based in Madrid.

Antigua and Barbuda has participated in the last two CARICOM-Spain Summits (2006 and 2008), held in Spain.

Economic relations 
Economic and commercial relations between Spain and Antigua and Barbuda are scarce. Main exports from Spain to A&B: ships and boats (almost 9 million and a half euros), machines and equipment (403,000 euros in 2011). In 2011, Spain imported ships and boats (415,000 euros) and clothing (81,320 euros).

Antigua and Barbuda's investments in Spain are minimal. The latest available data (2008: 1,524,180 euros, 2009: 259,920 euros and 2012: 54,690 euros) show a contraction and some concentration of investment flows in the building construction sector.

Cooperation 
In 2008, within the framework of EXPO ZARAGOZA 2008, a project was executed in the water sector (implementation of an integrated and sustainable management plan for
the natural resources of the island), and from 2006 to 2012, AECID funded a lecturer at St. John's State College. Cooperation is channeled through the Spain-Caribbean Community Fund (CARICOM) of AECID. The cooperation program with CARICOM is mainly aimed at supporting regional integration and institutional strengthening of the Caribbean Community.

The interlocutor of the Spanish Cooperation is the CARICOM Secretariat whose headquarters are in Georgetown (Guyana), and all the actions are included within the Regional Cooperation Program with CARICOM.

Antigua and Barbuda benefits from regional projects, such as the Regional Center for Advanced Technologies for High-Performance Crops (CEATA) for training in new agricultural technologies, based in Jamaica. In the field of Health, Antigua has been a beneficiary of a Project for the Prevention and Control of Cervical Cancer, in which the Mount St John's Medical Center received a donation of a colposcope in January 2010.

For several years Spain has financed the presence of a Spanish reader in St John's until the program has had to be suspended for budgetary reasons in mid-2012. In 2013 students from Antigua State 4 College received scholarships to study the AVE course of the Instituto Cervantes, through the Embassy of Spain in Kingston. In 2014, the Embassy donated 10 AVE licenses to the government of Antigua and Barbuda for Spanish students.

Throughout 2014, various cooperation projects are being executed in Antigua and Barbuda with AECID funding through the Spain-CARICOM Fund. One of these projects is a youth violence prevention program that started with National Consultations in various educational centers in St. John's in May 2014. In August, the training workshop for the creation of employment “Creativity” is planned for Employment and Business Opportunity ”(CEBO). Throughout 2015, several training programs financed by the AECID will be implemented in Antigua and Barbuda in matters of restoration and preservation of heritage.

References

External links 

 Embassy of Antigua and Barbuda in Madrid - His Excellency Dr. Dario Item is the Head of Mission.
 Honorary Consulate General of Antigua and Barbuda in the Principality of Monaco
 Antigua & Barbuda Official Business Hub

 
Spain
Antigua and Barbuda